The Bahamas women's national rugby union team are a national sporting side of the Bahamas, representing them at rugby union. The side played their first test against a Caribbean Select XV in 2010. They have only played two test matches to date, and are ranked 61st.

Record

(Full internationals only)

Full internationals

See also
 Rugby union in the Bahamas

External links
 Bahamas on IRB.com
 Rugby Bahamas
 Bahamas  on rugbydata.com

Rugby union in the Bahamas
Caribbean women's national rugby union teams
Rugby Union